The fourth cabinet of Ion I. C. Brătianu was the government of Romania from 11 December 1916 to 28 January 1918.

Ministers
The ministers of the cabinet were as follows:

President of the Council of Ministers:
Ion I. C. Brătianu (11 December 1916 - 28 January 1918)
Vice President of the Council of Ministers: 
Take Ionescu (11 December 1916 - 28 January 1918)
Minister of the Interior: 
Alexandru Constantinescu (11 December 1916 - 28 January 1918)
Minister of Foreign Affairs: 
Ion I. C. Brătianu (11 December 1916 - 28 January 1918)
Minister of Finance:
Victor Antonescu (11 December 1916 - 10 July 1917)
Nicolae Titulescu (10 July 1917 - 28 January 1918)
Minister of Justice:
Mihail G. Cantacuzino (11 December 1916 - 28 January 1918)
Minister of Religious Affairs and Public Instruction:
Ion Gh. Duca (11 December 1916 - 28 January 1918)
Minister of War:
Vintilă I. C. Brătianu (11 December 1916 - 10 July 1917)
(interim) Vintilă I. C. Brătianu (10 - 20 July 1917)
Gen. Constantin Iancovescu (20 July 1917 - 28 January 1918)
Minister of War Materiel:
Vintilă I. C. Brătianu (19 July 1917 - 28 January 1918)
Minister of Public Works:
Dimitrie Greceanu (11 December 1916 - 28 January 1918)
Minister of Industry and Commerce:
Constantin Istrati (11 December 1916 - 10 July 1917)
Barbu Delavrancea (10 July 1917 - 28 January 1918)
Minister of Agriculture and Property:
George G. Mârzescu (11 December 1916 - 28 January 1918)

Ministers without portfolio:
Mihail Pherekyde (11 December 1916 - 28 January 1918)
Emil Costinescu (11 December 1916 - 28 January 1918)
Take Ionescu (11 December 1916 - 10 July 1917)
Vintilă I. C. Brătianu (10 - 19 July 1917)

References

Cabinets of Romania
Cabinets established in 1916
Cabinets disestablished in 1918
1916 establishments in Romania
1918 disestablishments in Romania
Romania in World War I